Harpactea rubicunda is a spider species found in Georgia. It is also found in Lithuania.

See also 
 List of Dysderidae species

References 

Dysderidae
Spiders of Georgia (country)
Spiders of Europe
Spiders described in 1838